The Stepper is an album by drummer Frank Butler which was recorded in 1977 and released on the Xanadu label.

Reception

The Allmusic review recommended the album awarding it album 4½ stars and stating "the drummer is in top form on this quartet date... He never loses the listener's attention during his two long drum solos... this LP should be snapped up without delay by bop fans".

Track listing 
All compositions by Dolo Coker except as indicated
 "The Stepper" - 19:58  
 "Au Privave" (Charlie Parker) - 4:43  
 "Captain Kidd" - 5:51  
 "Easy Living" (Leo Robin, Ralph Rainger) - 5:38  
 "Urbane" – 8:36

Personnel 
Frank Butler - drums
Jack Montrose - tenor saxophone (tracks 1 & 3-5)
Dolo Coker - piano
Monty Budwig - bass

References 

Frank Butler (musician) albums
1978 albums
Xanadu Records albums
Albums produced by Don Schlitten